Blastobasis atlantella is a moth in the  family Blastobasidae. It was described by Hans Zerny in 1935. It is found in Morocco.

References

Natural History Museum Lepidoptera generic names catalog

Blastobasis
Moths described in 1935
Moths of Africa